Luke James Hellebronth (born 29 October 1985) is a British Christian musician, who primarily plays a contemporary Christian style of worship music. His first release, an extended play, Stand Up, was released in 2012, by Integrity Music.

Early life
Luke James Hellebronth was born on 29 October 1985. He started his music ministry in 2003, while he was attending Trinity College of Music studying his craft.

Music career
His music career started in 2003, yet his first extended play Stand Up was released on 12 November 2013 from Integrity Music.

Personal life
He is married to Anna Hellebronth, who is Irish, and they reside in Birmingham.

Discography
EPs
 Stand Up (12 November 2013, Integrity)

References

External links
 Cross Rhythms artist profile

1985 births
Living people
English Christians
British gospel singers
English songwriters
Singers from London